The Tully Trail is a  scenic loop trail located in the towns of Royalston, Orange, and Warwick, Massachusetts near the New Hampshire border. The route crosses several ledges with sweeping views of the surrounding rural countryside and passes three waterfalls (Royalston Falls, Spirit Falls, and Doane's Falls). Tully Mountain, Jacobs Hill, and Tully Lake are also located on the trail. The Tully Trail coincides briefly with the  Metacomet-Monadnock Trail. The route follows a mostly protected corridor of state, federal, and non-profit owned land.

Conservation
The Tully Trail is managed by The Trustees of Reservations and by the Mount Grace Land Conservation Trust. Many key parcels along the trail route have been conserved by these non-profit organizations.

References

External links
Tully Trail The Trustees of Reservations
Tully Trail map The Trustees of Reservations
Tully Lake Campground The Trustees of Reservations
Tully Lake U.S. Army Corps of Engineers
Tully Lake Park Map U.S. Army Corps of Engineers

Protected areas of Franklin County, Massachusetts
Protected areas of Worcester County, Massachusetts
Hiking trails in Massachusetts